Alvaro Mancori (1923–2011) was an Italian cinematographer. He also directed two films, and acted as producer on several others.

Selected filmography
 The Accusation (1950)
 Auguri e figli maschi! (1951)
 Tragic Return (1952)
 The Mute of Portici (1952)
 Mata Hari's Daughter (1954)
 The Violent Patriot (1956)
 The Wanderers (1956)
 The Beautiful Legs of Sabrina (1958)
 La cambiale (1959)
 The Moralist (1959)
 Toto in Madrid (1959)
 Vacations in Majorca (1959)
 Gentlemen Are Born (1960)
 Letto a tre piazze (1960)
 I piaceri dello scapolo (1960)
 Goliath and the Vampires (1961)
 Totò, Peppino e... la dolce vita (1961)
 Ulysses Against the Son of Hercules (1962)
 The Lion of St. Mark (1963)
 Toto and Cleopatra (1963)
 The Commandant (1963)
 Hercules the Invincible (1964)
 Gli uomini dal passo pesante (1965)
 The Strange Night (1967)
 Darling Caroline (1968)

References

Bibliography 
 Klossner, Michael. The Europe of 1500-1815 on Film and Television: A Worldwide Filmography of Over 2550 Works, 1895 Through 2000. McFarland, 2002.

External links 
 

1923 births
2011 deaths
Italian cinematographers
Italian film producers
Italian film directors
Film people from Rome